Sherlock Holmes and Dr. Watson is a 1979 Soviet film adaptation of Arthur Conan Doyle's novels about Sherlock Holmes. Directed by Igor Maslennikov, it is the first of a 5-part TV film series (divided into 11 episodes) The Adventures of Sherlock Holmes and Dr. Watson. The film is divided into two episodes: "The Acquaintance" (based on the 1892 short story "The Adventure of the Speckled Band") and "Bloody Inscription" (based on the 1887 novel A Study in Scarlet).

The movies are made close to the plot of the books, but have some notable, and sometimes quite humorous differences, e.g. Dr. Watson within first weeks of living in Baker Street was trying to figure out what was Holmes profession. Upon witnessing Holmes dressed in disguise, seeing some strange visitors, Watson comes to a conclusion that Holmes is a criminal mastermind.

Cast
 Vasily Livanov as Sherlock Holmes
 Vitaly Solomin as Dr. Watson
 Rina Zelyonaya as Mrs. Hudson

The Acquaintance
 Gennadi Bogachyov as Stamford
 Maria Solomina as Helen Stoner and Julia Stoner
 Fedor Odinokov as Dr. Roylott (voiced by Igor Yefimov)

Bloody Inscription
 Borislav Brondukov as Inspector Lestrade (voiced by Igor Yefimov)
 Igor Dmitriev as Inspector Gregson
 Nikolai Karachentsov as Jefferson Hope
 Viktor Aristov as Joseph Stangerson
 Adolf Ilyin as Enoch Drebber
 Boris Klyuyev as Mycroft Holmes (uncredited)

References

External links
 
 
 English subtitles for 1 series

1979 films
1979 in the Soviet Union
1970s Russian-language films
Films based on mystery novels
Russian mystery films
Sherlock Holmes films based on works by Arthur Conan Doyle
Lenfilm films
Soviet television miniseries
Films directed by Igor Maslennikov
1979 crime films
1970s Soviet television series
Soviet crime films
Russian crime films
1970s television miniseries
Soviet crime television series